"The Man in the Black Suit" is a horror short story by American writer Stephen King. It was originally published in the October 31, 1994 issue of The New Yorker magazine. 

In 1995, it won the World Fantasy Award and the O. Henry Award for Best Short Fiction. 

In 1997, it was published in the limited-edition collection Six Stories. 

In 2002, it was included in King's collection Everything's Eventual. King described the piece as an homage to Nathaniel Hawthorne's story "Young Goodman Brown". He also states that the story evolved from one his friend told him, in which the friend's grandfather had come face to face with Satan himself in the form of an ordinary man. It was adapted into a short film, with the same title, in 2004 by Nicholas Mariani.

Plot summary
"The Man in the Black Suit" recounts the tale of Gary, a nine-year-old boy, whose brother died, not long ago, due to a bee sting. One day, Gary goes out fishing and falls asleep. When he awakens, he's startled to discover a bee sitting on the edge of his nose. Although Gary doesn't share his brother's allergy to them, he is still scared. Suddenly, he hears a clap and the bee is dead. Turning around, Gary discovers a man with burning eyes looming over him. Dressed in a black three-piece suit, the man has pale skin and claw-like fingers. When he grins, his mouth exposes horrible shark-like teeth. The man—whose body odor smells like burnt match heads—tells Gary terrible things: that his mother has died while he was away, that his father intends to molest him, and that he (the man) intends to eat him. At first, Gary doesn't believe him. However, he soon realizes that the man is actually the devil. In order to dissuade the man in the black suit from eating him, Gary offers him a fish he caught, and the man swallows it whole. He tells Gary that he is still hungry so Gary tries to escape. The man pursues Gary to the outskirts of the forest. When Gary thinks he lost him, he sees the man right behind him. Throwing his fishing rod at the man, Gary continues to run home and meets his father outside. 

Gary believes the man's claim until seeing his mother in the kitchen. Gary realizes that the things the man said were false. Gary's father can see that he is shaken but he eventually persuades him to return with him to the spot in the forest to bring back the rest of his fishing equipment. When they arrive at the spot where Gary met the man in the black suit, Gary's father examines the scene where the man lay down and can see that the grass is black and that there is a foul smell. Gary can then sense that his father knows that something out of the ordinary happened where Gary was fishing. Gary's father also tells him not to return there.

The story is narrated by Gary, looking back from his perspective as an elderly man. He is haunted by his belief that he escaped from the devil by sheer luck or his own wits. As the story draws to a close, we learn that he's frightened by the thought of his approaching death and the possibility of a second encounter with the man in the black suit. Gary knows that he won't be able to outwit him or outrun him in his old age.

Short film adaptation
The book was adapted into a short film in 2004, with actor/writer and comedian John Viener in the titular role.

See also
 Stephen King short fiction bibliography

References

External links

Stephen King Short Movies

Short stories by Stephen King
1994 short stories
Works originally published in The New Yorker
World Fantasy Award-winning works
Fiction about the Devil
Short stories adapted into films
Philtrum Press books